Embassy of Nigeria may refer to:

 Embassy of Nigeria, Washington, D.C.
 Embassy of Nigeria in Moscow

See also
 List of diplomatic missions of Nigeria